Gonaha is a village in Rupandehi District in Lumbini Province of southern Nepal. At the time of the 1991 Nepal census it had a population of 10,838.

Formerly, Gonaha was a village development committee (VDC), which were local-level administrative units. In 2017, the government of Nepal restructured local government in line with the 2015 constitution and VDCs were discontinued.

References

Populated places in Rupandehi District